Events from the year 1307 in Ireland:

Incumbent
Lord: Edward I (until 7 July), then Edward II

Events 
 10 July -  Richard de Havering (or Richard de Haverings) (died 1341) was elected Archbishop of Dublin in March and appointed 10 July; although he received possession of the see's temporalities on 13 September, he was never consecrated and after enjoying the dignity and profits of the see resigned 21 November 1310.
 Donnchad Muimnech Ó Cellaigh, Lord of Uí Maine, killed most of the English of Roscommon at Ahascragh, in response to the burning of the town by Edmund Butler.
 Alexander de Bicknor appointed Lord Treasurer of Ireland

Deaths 
 Thomas FitzGerald, 3rd Baron Desmond
 Donnchad Muimnech Ó Cellaigh

References